Czechland may refer to:

 Czech Republic, a nation state in central Europe
 Czech lands, the three historical regions of Bohemia, Moravia, and Czech Silesia which constitute the Czech Republic
 Czechland Lake Recreation Area, in eastern Nebraska, United States